Trisha Posner is a British non-fiction writer. She is the author of This is Not Your Mother's Menopause: One Woman's Natural Journey Through Change (2000), No Hormones, No Fear (2003) and The Pharmacist of Auschwitz: The Untold Story (2017). She also wrote under her full name, Patricia Posner.

Early life 
Posner was born in London. She left school at age 16.

She moved to New York in 1978.

Career 
From 2005 to 2007, she was a columnist for Miami's Ocean Drive magazine.

Posner wrote The Pharmacist of Auschwitz after a meeting she and her husband, author Gerald Posner, had in 1985 in New York with Rolf Mengele, the only son of Nazi doctor Josef Mengele. The book received praise from Michael Granberry, Arts Critic for The Dallas Morning News, and was on The Wall Street Journal Nonfiction Bestseller list at number 6 on 21 January 2018. The book was translated into sixteen foreign languages and sold in various countries.

Posner has worked on thirteen investigative books of nonfiction with her husband, Gerald Posner. According to St. Petersburg Times she "works with him on his books and joins him in his interviews, but refuses co-author credit."  She has also written articles and profiles for national magazines, including Salon, The Huffington Post, and The Daily Beast. 

Posner has also been a commentator on television, NBC, MSNBC and FOX, regarding journalism careers.

In 2022 Posner appeared on the podcast Richard Helppie's Common Bridge where she claimed the use of gender-neutral language in medical contexts "erases women" and expressed concern about transgender athletes and transgender people using bathrooms or dressing rooms corresponding to their gender identity.

Controversy 
In 2007, she was at the center of a controversy, regarding whether a journalist could express an opinion opposed to that of her publisher on a public issue. According to the New York Post, she was "fired for civic activism." Her 2007 Wikinews interview sets forth the limits and risks for a journalist when it comes to disagreeing publicly with publishers. Gerald Posner wrote about the controversy in The Huffington Post.

Personal life 
In 2021 Posner was diagnosed with breast cancer.

Posner and her husband live in Miami, Florida as of 2022.

Books

Posner, Trisha (2000). This is not your mother's menopause : one woman's natural journey through change (Uncorrected proof. ed.). New York: Villard Books. .
Posner, Trisha (2003). No hormones, no fear : a natural journey through menopause (Villard Books trade pbk. ed. ed.). New York: Villard Books. .
Posner, Patricia (2017). The Pharmacist of Auschwitz: The Untold Story. Crux Publishing Ltd. .

References

External links

Official website

British non-fiction writers
Living people
1951 births